Major General Emilio Díaz Colón (born c. 1947), is a former United States National Guard officer who served as the Adjutant General of the Puerto Rican National Guard. In 2011, he became the first member of the PRNG to be named superintendent of the Puerto Rico Police Department.

Early years

Díaz Colón is the oldest of three siblings born to Emilio Díaz Lebron and Margarita Colón in the town of Yabucoa, Puerto Rico. His father was the head foreman of the Central Roig sugar cane plantation. The Central Roig was one of the last mills that produced sugar in Puerto Rico. Díaz Colón was raised in his hometown where he received his primary and secondary education. Díaz Colón's brother, Luis F. "Pickie" Díaz Colón, a former head of the National Parks Company, was once the mayor of their hometown Yabucoa.

In 1968, Díaz Colón joined the Puerto Rico Army National Guard (PRARNG) as an enlisted soldier in an engineer company, while at the same time he was enrolled and attended classes at the University of Puerto Rico at Mayagüez. In 1971, Díaz Colón earned his Bachelor of Arts degree in Civil Engineering.

Military career

Díaz Colón was selected to attend the warrant officer program at the United States Army Warrant Officer Career College in Fort Rucker, Alabama. Upon his graduation on February 4, 1975, he was promoted to the rank of Warrant Officer One (WO1). He was then assigned to the HHC 130th Engineer Battalion at Vega Baja, Puerto Rico where he served as Utilities Maintenance Technician. On August 3, 1976, he was promoted to the rank of first lieutenant and assigned as engineering officer for the same Battalion. From January 1977 to August 1979, Díaz Colón served with Company D 130th Engineer Battalion at Carolina, Puerto Rico in the positions of Engineer Platoon Leader and Company Executive Officer. After his promotion to the rank of captain he was named company commander.

In August 1979, he was reassigned to the 892d Engineer Company at Humacao, Puerto Rico as company commander and in September 1979, he was the Assistant S-3 of the Command and Control at PRNG Headquarters in San Juan, Puerto Rico. He served there until October 1979, when he returned to the 130th Engineer Battalion as battalion executive officer.

 Feb 75 - Aug 76, Utilities Maintenance Technician, HHC 130th Engineer Battalion, Vega Baja, Puerto Rico
 Aug 76 - Jan 77, Engineering Officer, HHC 130th Engineer Battalion, Vega Baja, Puerto Rico
 Jan 77 - May 77, Engineer Platoon Leader, Company D 130th Engineer Battalion, Carolina, Puerto Rico
 May 77 - Nov 77, Company Executive Officer, Company D, 130th Engineer Battalion, Carolina, Puerto Rico
 Nov 77 - Aug 79, Company Commander, Company D 130th Engineer Battalion, Carolina, Puerto Rico
 Aug 79 - Sep 79, Company Commander, 892d Engineer Company, Humacao, Puerto Rico
 Sep 79 - Oct 79, Assistant S-3, Command and Control, Headquarters, San Juan, Puerto Rico
 Oct 79 - Feb 83, Battalion Executive Officer, 130th Engineer Battalion, Vega Baja, Puerto Rico
 Feb 83 - Aug 85, Battalion Commander, 130th Engineer Battalion, Vega Baja, Puerto Rico
 Aug 85 - Jun 87, S-4, 101st Troop Command, Headquarters, State Area Command, San Juan, Puerto Rico
 Jun 87 - Feb 88, S-3, 101st Troop Command, Headquarters, State Area Command, San Juan, Puerto Rico
 Mar 88 - Jun 92, Executive Officer, 101st Troop Command, Headquarters State Area Command, San Juan, Puerto Rico
 Jul 92 - Dec 92, USAR - Not Active Duty Control Group (Individual Ready Reserve)
 Dec 92 - Jan 93, Deputy Chief of Staff, Headquarters State Area Command, San Juan, Puerto Rico
 Jan 93 - Jan 01, The Adjutant General, Puerto Rico National Guard, Headquarters State Area Command, San Juan, Puerto Rico

Government positions

In 1978, the governor of Puerto Rico, Carlos Romero Barcelo appointed Díaz Colón to the position of executive director of the Authority of Solid Wastes in Puerto Rico. He served in this position until 1981. In that year, he was named director of the Commissioners Office of Municipal Matters. He served in this position until 1985, all the while in 1982, he was promoted to the rank of major and in 1983, he attended the United States Army Command and General Staff College in Fort Leavenworth, Kansas.

During the years that he served in the Commissioners Office, the Puerto Rico National Guard named Díaz Colón Battalion Commander of the 130th Engineer Battalion. From 1985 to 1990, Díaz-Colón was given a Federal position when he was placed in charge of the Housing Urban Development (HUD) in the Caribbean.

Adjutant General, Puerto Rico National Guard

From August 1985 to June 1992, Díaz Colón served with the 101st Troop Command at Headquarters, State Area Command, San Juan, Puerto Rico. On July 24, 1987, he was promoted to lieutenant colonel and during the years in which he served at headquarters, he served in various positions, including that of executive officer. On July 23, 1992, Díaz Colón was promoted to the rank of colonel in the Regular Army and on December 22, of the same year he was promoted to the rank of brigadier general. In January 1993, he was named the adjutant general of the Puerto Rico National Guard. As adjutant general, he was the governor's senior military adviser and oversaw both state and federal missions of the Puerto Rico National Guard. He also provided effective leadership and management in the implementation of all programs and policies affecting more than 11,100 Puerto Rico National Guard citizens-soldiers. Díaz Colón was promoted to major general (line) on November 18, 1993, and continued as adjustant general until he retired from the Puerto Rico Army National Guard in 2001.

Superintendent of the Police of Puerto Rico

In July 2011, Luis Fortuño, the governor of Puerto Rico, named Díaz Colón for the position of superintendent of the Puerto Rico Police Department. He thus became the first person who was a former adjutant general of the Puerto Rico National Guard to be named to that position. Díaz Colón entered the Police Department in the middle of a record-breaking year in murders in Puerto Rico, and has received harsh criticisms ever since from various sectors. On March 28, 2012, after only 9 months on the job, Díaz Colón resigned as superintendent.

Military decorations and awards
Among  Major General Díaz Colón's military decorations and awards are the following:

  Meritorious Service Medal
  Army Commendation Medal (with one bronze oak leaf cluster)
  Army Achievement Medal
  Army Reserve Component Achievement Medal
  National Defense Service Medal
  Humanitarian Service Medal
  Armed Forces Reserve Medal (with Gold Hourglass Device)
  Army Service Ribbon

Puerto Rico National Guard decorations
   Puerto Rico Commendation Medal
   Puerto Rico Service Medal
   Puerto Rico Exemplary Conduct Ribbon
   Puerto Rico Civil Disturbance Ribbon
   Puerto Rico Disaster Relief Ribbon
   Puerto Rico Active Duty for Training Ribbon

See also

List of Puerto Ricans
List of Superintendents of the Puerto Rico Police
List of Puerto Rican military personnel
Puerto Rico Adjutant General

Notes

References

1950 births
Puerto Rican civil engineers
Living people
People from Yabucoa, Puerto Rico
Puerto Rico Adjutant Generals
20th-century Puerto Rican engineers
Puerto Rican military officers
Puerto Rican Army personnel
Recipients of the Meritorious Service Medal (United States)
Recipients of the Humanitarian Service Medal
National Guard (United States) generals
Superintendents of the Puerto Rico Police
United States Army generals
United States Army Command and General Staff College alumni
Puerto Rico National Guard personnel